Hasan Fehmi Pasha (1836–1910) was one of the leading Ottoman statesmen during the late Tanzimat period, who served in various governorships and juridical institutions. He was furthermore a member of the Senate, and a supporter of foreign investment, but at the same time an advocate of syndicates formed by multinational capitalists.

Biography 

Hasan Fehmi Pasha was born into a prominent wealthy family in Batum in 1836. He was of Georgian descent.

He became the head of the Ottoman Court of Justice in the year 1884. He was sent to various diplomatic missions in cities such as London and Rome. He became the president of the Council of State between 1907–1908. After a 3-month break, he again functioned as the president of the Council of State for one more year.

Hasan Fehmi Pasha died in Istanbul in 1910.

References

1836 births
1910 deaths
Place of birth missing
 Members of the Senate of the Ottoman Empire